Evald Mikson, ( – 27 December 1993) was a goalkeeper in the Estonian national football team, winning seven caps between 1934 and 1938.  Mikson played a controversial role as a collaborator during his service in  the police during the 1941–1944 Nazi German occupation of Estonia, and he has been accused of committing war crimes against Jews during World War II.

Overview 
In 2001, the Simon Wiesenthal Center published allegations that Mikson committed war crimes against the local Jews during the German occupation of Estonia, when he was working as Deputy Head of Police in Tallinn/Harjumaa.  Mikson's descendants have reportedly claimed that he had been at least on one occasion imprisoned by the Germans for hiding details about witnesses from his superiors, howevever records obtained by the Simon Wiesenthal Center indicate that he was actually detained for possessing gold stolen from his Jewish victims. 

Mikson escaped from Estonia to Sweden in 1944. In 1946, he was transported to the Norwegian border, where a boat to Venezuela waited. However, the boat was stranded in Iceland, and he remained there until his death.

Mikson himself claimed in 1992 that he was being called a Nazi collaborator and war criminal because of a "former colleague from the Estonian police force who is now a rich man living in Venezuela and who wanted revenge after I wrote an article about him and his crimes against Estonians in World War II".

In 1999, the Estonian International Commission for Investigation of Crimes Against Humanity singled out Mikson, along with Ain-Ervin Mere, Julius Ennok and Ervin Viks, for having signed numerous death warrants when they were members of the Political Police (Department B IV), headed by Ennok.

Family
Mikson was the father of Jóhannes Eðvaldsson, who played for Celtic F.C. in the 1970s, and of Atli Eðvaldsson, s former player for Borussia Dortmund, and player and coach for the Icelandic national football team.

References

External links
 
 Iceland, the Jews, and Anti-Semitism, 1625-2004

1911 births
1993 deaths
Sportspeople from Tartu
People from the Governorate of Livonia
Estonian footballers
Estonia international footballers
Estonian collaborators with Nazi Germany
Estonian World War II refugees
Association football goalkeepers
Estonian expatriates in Iceland
Estonian police officers